Béni Ourtilane (or At Wartiran as it is called by its native Kabyle inhabitants) is a district of the Sétif Province in the Petite Kabylie region of Algeria. It is named after its district capital Beni Ouartilene. It is located in the north-western part of the Sétif Province near the border with Béjaïa and Bordj Bou Arreridj. It was originally part of the Sétif Province when Algeria got its independence in 1962 but it became part of the Béjaïa Province in 1975. However, in 1985 it returned to become a part of the Sétif Province.

Municipalities
Béni Ourtilane consists of four municipalities:
 Béni Ourtilane
 Béni Chebana
 Ain Legredj
 Béni Mouhli

Transport
Due to its remote location in the Babor Mountains, Béni Ourtilane is only accessible by one road, National Route 74.

Notable people

 Cheikh Lhocine El Ouartilani
 Cheikh Fodil El Ouartilani
 Yahia Ait Hamoudi ben Abdellah Ait Hamoudi
 Abdellah ben Yahia Ait Hamoudi
 El Mouloud El Hafedi

References

Districts of Sétif Province
Kabylie